The 1968–69 season was Leeds United's fifth consecutive season in the First Division. Along with the First Division, they competed in the FA Cup, Football League Cup and the Inter-Cities Fairs Cup. The season covers the period from 1 July 1968 to 30 June 1969.

Background 
Following the resignation of Jack Taylor, Don Revie was appointed as player-manager.

Revie implemented a change of kit colour to an all-white strip in the style of Real Madrid, and concentrating the club policy on scouting and developing youth talent, rather than just trying to buy players. He appointed experienced coaches like Les Cocker, Maurice Lindley and Syd Owen, and implemented radical techniques like forming a family atmosphere around the club. Revie took on more revolutionary techniques, his pre-match preparation was meticulous for its day, his staff prepared highly detailed dossiers on the opposition before every match and pioneered a highly detailed approach to the way opposing teams could be analysed. Coaches like Les Cocker were also responsible for developing high fitness levels in the Leeds players, using diets and rigorous, military style training programs. Revie forged a completely new team around a crop of outstanding youth talents, including Norman Hunter, Paul Reaney, Peter Lorimer, Eddie Gray, Billy Bremner, Paul Madeley, Albert Johanneson and these were backed up by more experienced heads Jack Charlton, and veteran Scottish international central midfielder Bobby Collins. Revie also made a shrewd purchase in acquiring former Busby Babe winger John Giles from Manchester United, who Leeds' coaching staff would mould into one of the most influential central midfielders of the game. In 1964 this new team won promotion once more to the First Division.

Leeds made an immediate impact; they began the season with a scintillating 4–2 victory over defending league champions Liverpool, which would set the tone for the rest of the season. Revie's young side chased an improbable league and cup double finishing the 1964–65 season as runners up only to Busby's Manchester United, losing the title on goal average. They turned the tables on Manchester United in the FA cup semi-final replay, reaching the FA Cup Final where they were beaten 2–1 by Liverpool in a dour game, best remembered for the appearance of Albert Johanneson, the first black player to play in an FA Cup final.

The 1965–66 season saw Leeds consolidate their place in the First Division, finishing as runners up in the league again, and progressing through to the semi-finals of the Inter-Cities Fairs Cup with victories over sides such as Valencia and Torino.

The 1966–67 season saw Leeds finish 4th in the league, as well as reaching the FA Cup Semi-finals and making an early exit from the League Cup. In addition, their European campaign ended as beaten finalists in the Inter-Cities Fairs Cup, losing 2–0 to Dinamo Zagreb.

Leeds spent the 1967–68 season chasing four trophies; leading the title race for much of the season, although eventually losing out to Manchester City and finishing fourth. Revie's men were also beaten semi-finalists in the FA Cup, although they did find their first domestic and European successes, completing a League Cup and Fairs Cup double. Terry Cooper's goal securing a tense League Cup final victory against Arsenal, and a Mick Jones goal secured the Fairs cup victory over the veteran Hungarian side Ferencváros. Leeds were the first British team to win the trophy.

Season summary 
Having found success in both domestic and European cup competitions, manager Revie chose to focus on the league for the 1968–69 campaign. Leeds secured the title in April 1969 with a 0–0 draw with challengers Liverpool at Anfield, whose supporters congratulated the Leeds team. Leeds set a number of records including most points (67), most wins (27), fewest defeats (2) and most home points (39); a still-unbroken club record is their 34 match unbeaten run that extended into the following season. Leeds strengthened their front line, breaking the British transfer record by signing Allan Clarke from Leicester City for £165,000. They targeted the treble in 1969–70 and came close to achieving this, only to fail on all three fronts in a congested close season, finishing second in the league to Everton, losing the 1970 FA Cup Final to Chelsea (after a replay), and exiting the European Cup with a semi-final defeat to Celtic.

Competitions

Football League First Division

League table

Matches

FA Cup

Football League Cup

Inter-Cities Fairs Cup

Statistics

Appearances and goals

Notes

References 

1968-69
Leeds United F.C. season
1968-69
1960s in Leeds